Maysa Rejepova (born January 4, 1993 in Ashgabat) is a Turkmen sprinter.  She competed in the 100 metres competition at the 2012 Summer Olympics; she ran the preliminaries in a personal best of 12.80 seconds, which did not qualify her for Round 1.

References

1993 births
Living people
Turkmenistan female sprinters
Olympic athletes of Turkmenistan
Athletes (track and field) at the 2012 Summer Olympics
Athletes (track and field) at the 2014 Asian Games
Sportspeople from Ashgabat
Asian Games competitors for Turkmenistan
21st-century Turkmenistan women